Madeleine de La Tour d'Auvergne (1498 – 28 April 1519) was a younger daughter of Jean III de La Tour (1467– 28 March 1501), Count of Auvergne and Lauraguais, and Jeanne de Bourbon, Duchess of Bourbon (1465–1511). She was a penultimate representative of the senior branch of the house de La Tour d'Auvergne. Madeleine is best known for being the mother of Catherine de' Medici, the future Queen of France.

Biography

Marriage negotiations
As part of his efforts to gain power in Italy, Francis I of France turned to making certain strategic alliances. On 8 December 1515, he and Pope Leo X met and signed an agreement of friendship, in which Francis agreed to ensure the Vatican's authority over the Catholic Church in France, and Leo promised to support Francis' claim to the throne of Naples. This agreement, like most others of the time, was cemented with a marriage alliance. Leo's nephew Lorenzo II de' Medici had just become the leader of the Florentine republic in 1516. Francis wrote to congratulate him by stating, "I intend to help you with all my power. I also wish to marry you off to some beautiful and good lady of noble birth and of my kin, so that the love which I bear you may grow and be strengthened". The "good lady" Francis proposed: his wealthy and distant relative Madeleine. Lorenzo duly accepted, as it was a great honor to be tied to the French royal family, especially since he was of lesser nobility (the Medici being ennobled only recently), albeit an extremely wealthy one. For Madeleine and her family, they were delighted to be tied into the sphere of the Pope himself.

Wedding celebrations
She married Duke Lorenzo II de' Medicis in Château d'Amboise on 5 May 1518. Their wedding was a sumptuous festival that marked not only their union, but also the birth of a dauphin for Francis I. As with the other festivities Francis put on throughout his life, dancing figured very prominently. Dancing was done mostly in the Italian style. Seventy-two ladies were disguised in Italian, German, and other fashionable costumes, making for quite a rich display of silk and color. Francis gave Madeleine 10,000 gold coins, while Lorenzo offered rich gifts to France's nobility.

Death
She died in Italy shortly before her husband on 28 April of the following year, of what is believed to have been the plague (some speculate that it may have been infected by syphilis from her husband). She had just given birth to a daughter, Catherine de' Medici (1519–1589), the future Queen of France and consort of Henry II. Both she and her husband were said to have been delighted at the birth of Catherine as if she were a boy.

Inheritance
As both of their parents were deceased, Madeleine and her elder sister Anne shared extensive properties in Auvergne, Clermont, Berry, Castres, and Louraguais. Anne inherited Auvergne and married John Stewart, 2nd Duke of Albany in 1505. She outlived Madeleine by five years but died childless, after which the Counties of Auvergne and Boulogne as well as the barony of La Tour passed to Madeleine's daughter Catherine de' Medici and then to the French Crown.

Ancestry

See also
 House of La Tour d'Auvergne

References

Sources

1498 births
1519 deaths
Madeleine
French nobility
House of Medici
Duchesses of Urbino
Boulogne, Countess of, Madeleine de La Tour